Pelham, New York  is the name of two locations in Westchester County, New York: 

Pelham (town), New York, the Town of Pelham
Pelham Manor (village), New York, the Village of Pelham Manor
Pelham (village), New York, the Village of Pelham